Umurbey is a town (belde) in the Lapseki District, Çanakkale Province, Turkey. Its population is 2,377 (2021).

References

Populated places in Çanakkale Province
Lapseki District